Dirck Barendsz or Theodor Barendszoon (1534–1592) was a Dutch Renaissance painter from Amsterdam who traveled to Italy in his youth to learn from the Italian masters, most notably Titian.

Biography
He was trained by his father, a painter known as Dooven Barent, or deaf Barent, and in 1555, at the age of twenty-one, Barendsz travelled to Italy. During his seven-year stay there, Karel van Mander tells us that he was "nursed at the great Titian's bosem."

He was a great friend of Philip Van Marnix, whom he met in Rome, and Dominicus Lampsonius, with whom he corresponded in Latin. He was a good musician and his most notable work, among various other pieces Van Mander describes that he painted in Amsterdam, was a Judith. Among pieces worthy of mention in Leiden that Van Mander liked was a Venus that at the time he was writing in 1604 was in the possession of Sybrandt Buyck (son of the last Catholic mayor of Amsterdam, Joost Sijbrantsz Buyck). Van Mander further lists a Table and a Christmas piece in the possession of the Franciscans in Gouda, and a copy of a tronie by Titian, in the possession of Pieter Isaacsz (1569–1625), an Amsterdam painter and art dealer.

His chapel piece voor the Amsterdam militia, called a Fall of Lucifer by Mander, was destroyed in the beeldenstorm, but his militia portrait for the same group that hung in their meeting hall survived.
He died in Amsterdam.

Gallery

References

Further reading

External links
Dirck Barendsz on Artcyclopedia

1534 births
1592 deaths
Early Netherlandish painters
Painters from Amsterdam